Kidson Island is an island  long, lying  north-northeast of Byrd Head, Antarctica. It was discovered in February 1931 by the British Australian New Zealand Antarctic Research Expedition under Mawson, and named by him for Edward Kidson.

See also 
 List of Antarctic and sub-Antarctic islands

References

Islands of Mac. Robertson Land